The 2003 WPA World Nine-ball Championship was the 14th edition of the WPA World Championship for 9-Ball Pool. It took place from July 12 to 20, 2003 in Cardiff, Wales .

Thorsten Hohmann won the event 17–10 victory in the final against Filipino Alex Pagulayan. Defending champion Earl Strickland was eliminated in the semi-final against Hohmann.

Tournament format 
The event featured 128 participating players which were divided into 16 groups, in which they competed in round robin mode against each other. The top four players in each group qualified for a knockout round from the stage of the last 64.

Controversy
The event saw reigning champion Earl Strickland play 6-time world Snooker champion Steve Davis in the last 16. Before the match, held in Cardiff, during a press conference, Strickland commented that he knew that the fans were being disrespectful towards him, and favouring Davis. During the match, Strickland referred to a crowd member as an "asshole", and began to talk during Davis' shots, against the rules. Referee Michaela Tabb warned Strickland, to which he replied that Tabb should "shut up". Davis would use his entitled comfort break shortly before the next frame, despite already being down on the shot to break. Davis would later suggest this was used as gamesmanship.

During the break, Strickland put his fingers in his ears to block out the crowd's support for Davis. With the match at 10 racks to 9, in favour of Strickland, he missed a long 6 ball. Using the rest, Davis would miss an "easy" shot (according to Strickland), from where Strickland would leap out of his seat, and exclaim that Davis had "dogged it." Strickland's tirade against Davis, the crowd, and the rules of the event, continued through the main part of a post-match interview, before visibly calming and apologizing for his behaviour. After admitting regret over his reactions during the encounter with Davis, Strickland entered the arena for his next match carrying a bunch of flowers which he gave to Tabb by way of an apology, and proceeded to play in a much calmer manner for the remainder of the event.

Strickland had also played the 2003 World Snooker champion Mark Williams in the preliminaries of the competition, winning 5–3.

Preliminary round 
The following players were knocked out of the competition in the preliminary round, finishing 5th or lower in the round robin.

Final round 
Those that qualified, would play in a knockout round.

References

External links
Live scoring at WPA-pool.com
 Empire Poker WPA World Pool Championship 2003 at azbilliards.com

2003
WPA World Nine-ball Championship
WPA World Nine-ball Championship
International sports competitions hosted by Wales